The 1941 VFL Lightning Premiership was an Australian rules football knockout competition played entirely on Saturday 24, May. It was played during a weeks break of the Victorian Football Leagues's 1941 VFL season between rounds 4 and 5 with all games being played at the MCG. The competition was also played on the same day as an interstate match between New South Wales and Victoria in Sydney. This was the second time a lightning premiership had been contested in the VFL. It was contested by the 12 VFL teams who competed in the 1941 VFL season. A crowd of 19,572 attended the competition. Collingwood won the competition by 1 point, defeating Melbourne in the final.

Matches

Round 1

Quarter finals

|- bgcolor="#CCCCFF"
| Home team
| Home team score
| Away team
| Away team score
| Ground
| Date
|- bgcolor="#FFFFFF"
| Essendon
| 3.2 (20)
| Melbourne
| 4.3 (27)
| MCG
| Saturday, 24 May
|- bgcolor="#FFFFFF"
| Collingwood
| 2.7 (19)
| Geelong
| 0.0 (0)
| MCG
| Saturday, 24 May
|- bgcolor="#CCCCFF"
|colspan=6 style="text-align:center;"| Bye: Fitzroy, St Kilda

Semi finals

|- bgcolor="#CCCCFF"
| Home team
| Home team score
| Away team
| Away team score
| Ground
| Date
|- bgcolor="#FFFFFF"
| Fitzroy
| 2.2 (14)
| Melbourne
| 2.5 (17)
| MCG
| Saturday, 24 May
|- bgcolor="#FFFFFF"
| St Kilda
| 2.0 (12)
| Collingwood
| 3.2 (20)
| MCG
| Saturday, 24 May

Grand final

|- bgcolor="#CCCCFF"
| Home team
| Home team score
| Away team
| Away team score
| Ground
| Date
|- bgcolor="#FFFFFF"
| Melbourne
| 3.1 (19)
| Collingwood
| 3.2 (20)
| MCG
| Saturday, 24 May

See also
List of Australian Football League night premiers
Australian Football League pre-season competition
1941 VFL season

Australian Football League pre-season competition
Vfl Lightning Premiership, 1941